"The Greatest Rock 'n Roll Band in the World" a.k.a. "Stars Medley" a.k.a. "Stars on 45 III: Rollin' Stars" is a song issued in 1982 by the Dutch studio group Stars on 45, in the UK credited to 'Starsound', in the US 'Stars On'. It was the second single from the band's third full-length release The Superstars (UK title: Stars Medley, US title: Stars on Long Play III).

The "Greatest Rock 'n Roll Band in the World" medley featured hits by the Rolling Stones, covering the mainpart of the band's career from their 1965 breakthrough with "I Can't Get No Satisfaction" via classics like "Under My Thumb", "Miss You", "Sympathy For The Devil" and "Honky Tonk Women" to their then most recent hit "Start Me Up" in the Autumn of 1981. The medley had first been released on the Superstars album in its full side-long, twenty-seven titles and sixteen-minute format. The heavily edited five-minute seven-inch version only featured ten of the Stones titles while the near ten-minute twelve-inch single included seventeen. The 7" single is commonly found on CD and the full album version was released on CD on the 2011 30th Anniversary best off edition for the first time. The 12" has not been released on CD (as of yet 2019).
 
By the release of the Stones medley in June 1982 there were already signs of a backlash against 'copycat medleys' by anonymous studio groups - even with a large number of parodies of the format being released (see Stars on 45 main bio, Other similar acts). The previous single "Stars on Stevie" had indeed become another hit on both sides of the Atlantic but the following album had failed to make much of an impact on either the British or the American charts; in the UK it peaked at #94 and dropped out of the listing after just one week, in the US the album didn't even register on Billboard's Top 200, and when the Stones medley single was released it met with the same indifference. While "The Greatest Rock 'n Roll Band..." did reach the Top 20 in the Netherlands, peaking at #15, it was the first Stars on 45 single to peak outside the Dutch Top 10 chart. It also failed to chart in both the US and the UK - where it somewhat confusingly was released by CBS under exactly the same title as both the preceding single and the third album; "Stars Medley".

This resulted in producer Jaap Eggermont deciding to change the formula by launching the spin-off group The Star Sisters, fronted by Patricia Paay, Yvonne Keeley and Sylvana van Veen, whose first single was released under the moniker Stars on 45 Proudly Presents The Star Sisters and topped the Dutch charts. The Sisters went on to release three albums and some ten singles in Continental Europe between the years 1983 and 1987 to moderate international success.

Track listing 7" single

Side A
"The Greatest Rock 'n Roll Band In The World" (7" Mix) - 5:03

All tracks written by Mick Jagger and Keith Richards unless otherwise noted 
 "The Stars Will Never Stop" (Eggermont, Duiser)
 "Sympathy for the Devil"
 "Brown Sugar"
 "Jumpin' Jack Flash"
 "Under My Thumb"
 "Honky Tonk Women"
 "Out of Time"
 "Emotional Rescue"
 "She's a Rainbow"
 "Start Me Up"
 "Angie"

Side B

"Don't Give Up" (7" Mix) (Eggermont, Duiser) - 3:56

Track listing 12" single

Side A
"The Greatest Rock 'n Roll Band In The World" (12" Mix) - 9:50

All tracks written by Mick Jagger and Keith Richards unless otherwise noted 
 "The Stars Will Never Stop" (Eggermont, Duiser)
 "Introduction" (Eggermont, Duiser)
 "Stars On" Jingle (Eggermont, Duiser)
 "Brown Sugar"
 "Jumpin' Jack Flash"
 "Take It or Leave It"
 "Under My Thumb"
 "Honky Tonk Women"
 "Lady Jane"
 "(I Can't Get No) Satisfaction"
 "Get off of My Cloud"
 "Stars On" Jingle (Eggermont, Duiser)
 "Out of Time"
 "Tell Me (You're Coming Back)"
 "We Love You"
 "Play with Fire" (Nanker Phelge)
 "It's Only Rock 'n Roll (But I Like It)"
 "Emotional Rescue"
 "She's a Rainbow"
 "Start Me Up"
 "Angie"

Side B

"Don't Give Up" (12" Mix) (Eggermont, Duiser) - 5:36

Track listing full album version

"The Greatest Rock 'n Roll Band In The World" (album version) - 15:59

All tracks written by Mick Jagger and Keith Richards unless otherwise noted 
 "The Stars Will Never Stop" (Eggermont, Duiser)
 "Sympathy for the Devil"
 "Miss You"
 "As Tears Go By" (Jagger/Richard/Oldham)
 "Brown Sugar"
 "Jumpin' Jack Flash"
 "Take It or Leave It"
 "Under My Thumb"
 "Honky Tonk Women"
 "Lady Jane"
 "(I Can't Get No) Satisfaction"
 "Get off of My Cloud"
 "Stars On" Jingle (Eggermont, Duiser)
 "Out of Time"
 "Tell Me (You're Coming Back)"
 "We Love You"
 "Play with Fire" (Nanker Phelge)
 "It's Only Rock 'n Roll (But I Like It)"
 "Ruby Tuesday"
 "Star Star"
 "Emotional Rescue"
 "She's a Rainbow"
 "Start Me Up"
 "Angie"

Chart peaks

Sources and external links
 
 
 Rateyourmusic.com biography and discography
 The Dutch Stars on 45 fansite
 Top40.nl
 Dutch Charts, Dutch Hitparade and Belgian Charts

1982 singles
Stars on 45 songs
CNR Music singles
RCA Records singles